Baljeet Yadav is an Indian politician from Rajasthan. He is currently a member of Rajasthan Legislative Assembly (MLA) from the Behror Constituency in Alwar district since December 2018.

References 

1976 births
Living people
Independent politicians in India
Rajasthan MLAs 2018–2023
People from Alwar district